= Khwenena =

Khwenena Temporal range: Early Pliocene

Scientific classification
- Kingdom: Animalia
- Phylum: Chordata
- Class: Aves
- Order: Psittaciformes
- Family: Psittacidae
- Genus: †Khwenena
- Species: †K. leopoldinae

Binomial name
- †Khwenena leopoldinae Manegold, 2013

Extinct genus of birds

Khwenena is an extinct genus of psittacid that lived during the Zanclean stage of the Pliocene epoch.

== Distribution ==
Khwenena leopoldinae is known from the Varswater Formation of South Africa.
